Smoke on This... is the debut solo studio album by American musician Rex Brown, released on July 28, 2017 via the label Entertainment One. For the first time in Brown's career, the work features him not only as a bassist but also as lead vocalist and guitarist.

Track listing

Personnel 
 Rex Brown – lead vocals, bass, guitar
 Lance Harvill – lead guitar
 Joe Shadid – rhythm guitar
 Johnny Kelly – drums

References

2017 debut albums
Rex Brown albums